Farm Relief is a 1929 animated short subject produced by Columbia Pictures, featuring Krazy Kat. The film is also the character's fifth to employ sound after the studio made the transition less than a year before.

Plot
Krazy lives in a barn with his farm animals. Whenever he has no farm work to do, he plays on his piano.

One day a pig in black coat and sunglasses comes to the farm. He then puts up a stand to sell liquor. His first customer is a cow. The cow, after drinking a few ounces, then heads to tell the other animals. They too are instrested as they flock to the stand.

Eventually, Krazy learns of this when he sees an intoxicated chicken. Though he reprimands that fowl for drinking, he also becomes interested when other animals come and offer him a bottle. And when he too drinks and gets intoxicated, Krazy celebrates by playing a piano and singing the song Down by the Old Mill Stream. The animals join his singing.

After playing his instrument, Krazy goes to collect milk from a cow. It turns out what he tries to milk is actually a donkey. The angry donkey pushes Krazy back and smashes the pail on his head. A real cow shows up feeling sympathetic for Krazy as the cartoon irises out.

See also
 Krazy Kat filmography

References

External links
Farm Relief at the Big Cartoon Database
 

1929 films
American animated short films
American black-and-white films
1929 animated films
Films set on farms
Krazy Kat shorts
Columbia Pictures short films
1920s American animated films
Columbia Pictures animated short films
Screen Gems short films